Moonlit Night on the Dnieper is an oil on canvas painting by Ukrainian artist Arkhip Kuindzhi made in 1880.

Description
The painting displays the banks of the Dnieper river at night during a full moon. The horizon line is heavily lowered, such that a very large portion of the painting is occupied by the sky. The moonlight is reflected by the river.

History
Kuindzhi began work on the painting in the summer and fall of 1880. After starting the painting process, he opened his studio to the public for two hours each Sunday for those who wished to see him working. Even before the painting's public exhibition, it was purchased from the workshop by Grand Duke Konstantin Konstantinovich. Several of Kuindzhi's correspondents and friends visited the studio while he was working on the painting to see the work. These included Ivan Turgenev, Yakov Polonsky, Ivan Kramskoi, and Dmitri Mendeleev.

When the painting was put on exhibition, it was done so in the hall of the Society for the Encouragement of Artists in Saint Petersburg. Kuindzhi was attentive to his paintings' lighting, and took extra precautions with "Moonlit Night." The painting was placed on a wall, the window curtains were lowered to block outside light, and an artificial light was centered on the painting to accentuate its features.

Unusually, "Moonlit Night" was the only painting in the exhibition, made even more strange by its apparently humble nature. It was rather small, and was just a landscape. Regardless, a crowd formed outside with a long line to see the painting, and visitors had to be allowed inside in groups to avoid a crowd crush. According to some accounts, visitors believed that the painting was illuminated from behind using a lamp because the moonlight was so realistic, and sought to find the source of light during the exhibition.

References

1880 paintings
Ukrainian paintings
Dnieper
Collections of the Russian Museum
Moon in art